Brookesia confidens, also known as the leaf chameleon, is one of the world's smallest species of chameleons. It is endemic to the Ankarana Nature Reserve (Ankarana National Park) in Madagascar. It was first described in 2012 by F. Glaw, J. Koehler, T.M. Townsend and M. Vences.

Distribution and habitat 
Found in northern Madagascar, B. confidens is one of the world's smallest chameleons. It was discovered in the Ankarana National Nature Reserve. It was first described in 2012 by Glaw, Koehler, Townsend and Vences. The nature reserve where B. confidens can be found on is well-protected. Little habitat destruction is currently occurring that could impact the species.

Description 
Brookesia confidens is smaller than half of a human finger, and is roughly the size of a wedding ring. It is the sister taxon of Brookesia tuberculata (Mount d'Ambre leaf chameleon). It is just larger than Brookesia micra. It looks identical to Brookesia desperata, Brookesia micra and Brookesia tristis.

Taxonomy 
Brookesia confidens is commonly known as the leaf chameleon.

References 

C
Endemic fauna of Madagascar
Reptiles of Madagascar
Reptiles described in 2012
Taxa named by Frank Glaw
Taxa named by Jörn Köhler
Taxa named by Miguel Vences